Heroic Losers is a 2019 Argentine heist film film co-written and directed by Sebastián Borensztein, based on the novel La noche de la Usina (The Night of the Heroic Losers) by Eduardo Sacheri, who also co-wrote the screenplay. It features an ensemble cast including Ricardo Darín, Luis Brandoni, Chino Darín, Verónica Llinás, Daniel Aráoz, Carlos Belloso, Marco Caponi, Rita Cortese, and Andrés Parra.

Heroic Losers was released in Argentina on 15 August 2019, and it held its international premiere as part of the Special Presentations section at the Toronto International Film Festival. The film received praise for its performances, and critics compared it to How to Steal a Million (1966) and Ocean's Eleven (2001). It was selected as the Argentine entry for the Best International Feature Film at the 92nd Academy Awards, but it was not nominated.

Plot
In August 2001, in the small town of Villa Alsina, Fermín Perlassi, his wife Lidia and his friend Antonio Fontana come up with a plan to reopen an agricultural cooperative which went bankrupt years ago. To do so, they learn the minimal investment to cover the initial costs reaches 300,000 pesos and bring the idea to the town's residents: mechanic Rolo Belaúnde, self-employed fix-it brothers Gómez, unemployed riparian Medina and Carmén Lorgio, the town's shipping company's owner, who all agree and chip in. They manage to reach 158,653 pesos, which Fermín deposits in the bank vault in Villagrán.

A few days later, Alvarado, the bank manager, summons Fermín to the bank and manipulates him into depositing the money in his own account. Fermín complies and travels back to Alsina, but the financial crisis reaches its peak the next day as the President decides to freeze every U.S. dollar-denominated accounts in Argentina. Alvarado knew about the incoming government measures and personally approved a loan request by Fortunato Manzi, a lawyer who converted the credit to U.S. dollars and withdrew all deposited dollar bills from Fermín's bank. Fermín and Lidia confront Alvarado, to no avail. In the way back, their car is run off the road by a truck. The accident kills Lidia and severely injures Fermín.

One year later, Manzi hires a construction worker to dig a 10 square feet hole in the middle of a nearby rural area. Convinced that it serves as burial vault to store the dollars, Balaúnde, Fontana, Fermín, his son Rodrigo, Fontana, Medina, the Gómez brothers, Carmen and her son, Hernán, reunite and decide to crack the vault and retrieve their "stolen" money. Manzi, however, has installed an impenetrable alarm device around the vault. After rewatching a scene from How to Steal a Million, Fermín comes up with the idea to set off the alarm multiple times. This will force Manzi to disconnect its battery, which coupled with a power supply cut, would allow the crew to enter the vault. Meanwhile, Rodrigo poses as a gardener assigned to work at Manzi's office lawn to keep track of him.

Fermín and Fontana track the power cables and succeed in installing a junction box, repeatedly cutting and restoring the area's power supply and causing the alarm to set off multiple times a day. Manzi eventually disconnects the battery. His secretary Florencia, however, realizes Rodrigo is not a gardener, which prompts him to confess her their plans. Trusting she will not tell Manzi about it, Rodrigo convinces the group to carry on with the plan.

That night, the crew splits into two groups: Belaúnde and Medina are tasked with destroying the power generator that supplies the area while Fermin, Rodrigo and Hernán will break into the safe when the lights go off. By accident, Medina creates an explosion that destroys all generators, causing a massive blackout. Manzi, who is in a party affected by the power outage, suspects something is wrong and heads to the vault. Meanwhile, Fermín and the others break into the vault and proceed to retrieve the money. Manzi arrives soon after, but his car gets stuck in a mud barricade set by Fontana. The crew flees with the money as Manzi curses and threatens them by a distance. Later, they separate the money in two cars: one driven by Rodrigo and other by Hernán, and return to Alsina.

The next day, Fermin is consoling Cármen: Hernán ran away with nearly 2 million dollars in his car and haven't made contact since. In spite of that, they use the money to reopen the agricultural cooperative, which guarantees a better life for everyone in Alsina.

In a mid-credits scene, Manzi arrives at Fontana's auto shop with a flat tire. Fontana unzips his pants, rubs his mate's bombilla against his crotch, places it in the gourd and offers it to Manzi, who drinks it as his tire is swapped.

Cast 

Ale Gigena and Guillermo Jacubowicz also appear as the Gómez brothers, while Luciano Cazaux and Ailín Zaninovich appear as Alvarado and Florencia, respectively.

Reception

Critical response 
TodasLasCríticas, which uses a weighted average, assigned the film a score of 76 out of 100 based on 56 critics.

Pablo Scholz of Clarín called the film a "great adaptation" of Sacheri's novel, and praised the cast as "impressively even and talented." María Fernanda Mugica of La Nación wrote, "The script achieves an entertaining plot, interspersed with a reflection about human behavior and featuring characters with whom it is impossible not to empathize," and compared the plot and casting of familiar faces to Ocean's Eleven, although she noted the humor as the weakest aspect of the film.

Further comparisons to Ocean's Eleven appeared throughout English-speaking reviews—referring to Darín's character as "an Argentinean Danny Ocean"—, which also noted the inspiration drawn from How to Steal a Million. Barry Hertz of The Globe and Mail gave the film three out of four stars, and called it "a thoroughly entertaining, if not especially enthralling, cinematic caper". Varietys Scott Tobias wrote, "At close to a full two hours, Heroic Losers takes too much time in the wind-up without the emotional payoffs Borensztein labors so hard to get." However, he praised "its expression of national character." Writing for Screen Daily, Sarah Ward said, "Heroic Losers isn’t heavy on surprises; not in its comfortable rhythms, warm-hued look at rural Argentine struggles, overt fist-pumping moments or reliable performances. Borensztein’s feature also starts slowly, pads out its narrative and doesn’t quite know when to end. And yet, in transforming bleak reality into an uplifting fantasy, this remains a thoroughly likeable movie."

In a more critical review, Luciano Monteagudo of Página/12 considered the film "a new step-back for big-budget Argentine cinema that in recent years—with few exceptions—has taken refuge in the most tested and conservative formulas."

Awards

See also
 List of Argentine films of 2019
 List of Spanish films of 2019
 List of submissions to the 92nd Academy Awards for Best International Feature Film
 List of Argentine submissions for the Academy Award for Best International Feature Film

References

External links 

 
 

2019 films
Argentine crime drama films
Films scored by Federico Jusid
MOD Producciones films
2010s Spanish-language films
2010s Spanish films
Spanish crime drama films
2010s Argentine films
2020s heist films
Films set in 2001
Films set in Argentina
2010s crime comedy-drama films
2019 crime films
2019 comedy-drama films
Argentine comedy-drama films
Argentine crime comedy-drama films
Argentine crime films
Argentine adventure films
2010s adventure films
2010s adventure comedy-drama films
2019 adventure films